Illuminations is the fifth studio album by American singer-songwriter Josh Groban, produced by Rick Rubin. Similar to his previous albums, Illuminations contains songs sung in a variety of languages, including his first take on a Portuguese song, "Você Existe Em Mim", which Groban co-wrote with Lester Mendez and Carlinhos Brown. The album was released on November 15, 2010.

Album information
The official title and cover art for Illuminations was revealed in September 2010. In addition to the regular release, a special fan edition of the album is available for purchase on Groban's website that contains the original CD, a "making-of" DVD, a 48-page color photo book filled with lyrics and pictures, and two bonus tracks (to be delivered digitally).

The first single from the album, "Hidden Away", was released on September 13, and was also available to download for free on Groban's website and Facebook from September 8–13.

Leading up to the album's release, iTunes released songs periodically from the album to download, which began on October 12 with the release of the album's Portuguese song "Você Existe Em Mim". A third song, "Higher Window", was released on October 25. A fourth and final song, "L'Ora Dell'Addio", was released on November 9.

Beginning May 12, 2011, Groban embarked on a worldwide tour entitled the Straight to You Tour to promote the album.

Reception

Critical reception

Illuminations received mostly positive reviews from music critics.

Commercial reception
The album debuted at No. 4 on the Billboard 200, selling 190,000 copies in its first week and was certified platinum by the RIAA for shipping over a million copies. The album has since sold over 800,000 copies in the US. In Canada, the album debuted at No. 4 on the Canadian Albums Chart and was certified platinum for shipping over 80,000 copies.

Track listing
The following is the track listing for the regular album:

Orchestra and Choir arranged and conducted by David Campbell

Charts

Weekly charts

Year-end charts

Certifications

References

External links
 
 

2010 albums
Josh Groban albums
Albums produced by Rick Rubin
143 Records albums
Reprise Records albums
Albums recorded at Shangri-La (recording studio)